is a former Japanese football player and manager. He played for Japan national team.

Club career
Kimura was born in Hiroshima on July 19, 1958. After graduating from Meiji University, he joined Nissan Motors (later Yokohama Marinos) in 1981. From 1982, he wore the number 10 shirt. He was selected Japanese Footballer of the Year awards in 1983 and 1984. The club also won 1983 and 1985 Emperor's Cup. From 1988 to 1990, the club won all three major title in Japan; Japan Soccer League, JSL Cup and Emperor's Cup for 2 years in a row. He was also selected Japanese Footballer of the Year awards again 1989. In 1990s, the club won 1990 JSL Cup, 1991 and 1992 Emperor's Cup. In Asia, the club won 1991–92 and 1992–93 Asian Cup Winners' Cup. He was a central player in golden era in club history. He retired in 1994. He played 251 games and scored 51 goals in the league. He was selected Japanese Footballer of the Year awards 3times and Best Eleven 5 times.

National team career
On May 31, 1979, when Kimura was a Meiji University student, he debuted for Japan national team against Indonesia. He played at 1980 Summer Olympics qualification and 1982 World Cup qualification. From 1982, he played in all matches of Japan national team included 1982, 1986 Asian Games, 1984 Summer Olympics qualification and 1986 World Cup qualification. In 1985, he scored goals in six consecutive games. This is a record of continuous score in Japan national team. He played 54 games and scored 26 goals for Japan until 1986.

Coaching career
Kimura became a manager for Yokohama F. Marinos in 2010. In 2011, although the club compete for the champions till half way, the club stalled in the late stages and finished 5th place. He was sacked end of 2011 season.

Club statistics

National team statistics

Managerial statistics

Honours and awards

Team
 Japan Soccer League Champions: 1988–89, 1989–90
 JSL Cup Champions: 1988, 1989, 1990
 Emperor's Cup Champions: 1983, 1985, 1988, 1989, 1991, 1992
 Asian Cup Winners' Cup Champions: 1991–92, 1992–93

Awards
 Japanese Football Player of the Year: 1983, 1984, 1989
 Japan Soccer League Most Valuable Player: 1989-90
 Japan Soccer League Best Eleven (5): 1983, 1984, 1985–86, 1988–89, 1989–90
 Japan Soccer League Assists leader: 1984
 Japan Football Hall of Fame: Inducted in 2020

References

External links
 
 Japan National Football Team Database
 
 

1958 births
Living people
Meiji University alumni
Association football people from Hiroshima Prefecture
Japanese footballers
Japan international footballers
Japan Soccer League players
J1 League players
Yokohama F. Marinos players
Japanese football managers
J1 League managers
Yokohama F. Marinos managers
Footballers at the 1982 Asian Games
Footballers at the 1986 Asian Games
Association football midfielders
Asian Games competitors for Japan